Baron Jacques De Staercke (19272017) was a Belgian businessman and politician. He was a member of the Coudenberg group, a Belgian federalist think tank.

He was a politician for the Christelijke Volkspartij / Parti Social Chrétien (CVP-PSC) from 1945 until 1972 and of the Nationaal Comité voor Vrijheid en Democratie from 1954 onward.

Sources
 Claude Carboneel, Jacques De Staercke, opdracht: ondernemen, vijftien jaar Fabrimetal-beleid, Lannoo, Tielt, 1987
 Jacques De Staercke

Belgian businesspeople
1927 births
2017 deaths